Zach Michael Logue (born April 23, 1996) is an American professional baseball pitcher in the Detroit Tigers organization. He made his MLB debut in 2022 with the Oakland Athletics.

Amateur career
Logue attended Archbishop Moeller High School in Cincinnati, Ohio, and the University of Kentucky, where he played college baseball for the Kentucky Wildcats. In 2016, he played collegiate summer baseball with the Orleans Firebirds of the Cape Cod Baseball League.

Professional career

Toronto Blue Jays
The Toronto Blue Jays selected Logue in the ninth round of the 2017 Major League Baseball draft.

Logue spent his first professional season with the rookie-level Bluefield Blue Jays and Low-A Vancouver Canadians, logging a 1.47 ERA in 12 combined appearances. He spent 2018 with the Single-A Lansing Lugnuts and the High-A Dunedin Blue Jays, and pitched to a 12-4 record and 3.15 ERA with 129 strikeouts in 154.1 innings of work across 27 appearances (25 of them starts). In 2019, Logue split the year between the Double-A New Hampshire Fisher Cats and Triple-A Buffalo Bisons, recording a cumulative 4.14 ERA with 83 strikeouts in 104.1 innings of work in 20 games between the two teams. Logue did not play in a game in 2020 due to the cancellation of the minor league season because of the COVID-19 pandemic. He started the 2021 season with New Hampshire before being promoted to Buffalo. On the year, he worked to a 12-4 record and 3.67 ERA with 144 strikeouts in 125.0 innings pitched in 25 total games (24 of them starts). He was added to the 40-man roster following the season on November 19, 2021.

Oakland Athletics
On March 16, 2022, the Blue Jays traded Logue, Gunnar Hoglund, Kevin Smith, and Kirby Snead to the Oakland Athletics for Matt Chapman.

On April 15, 2022, Logue was added to the Athletics roster for their road trip to Toronto as a COVID-related substitute. The Athletics designated Logue for assignment after the 2022 season.

Detroit Tigers
On December 23, 2022, Logue was claimed off waivers by the Detroit Tigers. Logue was then designated for assignment by the Tigers on December 31. On January 6, 2023, Logue was sent outright to the Triple-A Toledo Mud Hens.

References

External links

1996 births
Living people
People from Mason, Ohio
Baseball players from Ohio
Major League Baseball pitchers
Oakland Athletics players
Kentucky Wildcats baseball players
Orleans Firebirds players
Bluefield Blue Jays players
Vancouver Canadians players
Lansing Lugnuts players
Dunedin Blue Jays players
New Hampshire Fisher Cats players
Buffalo Bisons (minor league) players
Las Vegas Aviators players